Roger Galwanao Mukasa (born 22 August 1989) is a Ugandan international cricketer. He played in the 2006 U-19 Cricket World Cup in Sri Lanka. He has represented Uganda in first-class, List A and Twenty20 cricket. His shirt number is 37.

Career
Mukasa was selected in the Uganda cricket team's squad for the 2006 Under-19 Cricket World Cup. Roger Mukasa played against Sarfaraz 11 or the Pakistan national U-19 cricket team, which won the tournament.

In April 2018, he was named as the captain of the Uganda squad for the 2018 ICC World Cricket League Division Four tournament in Malaysia. In July 2018, he was part of Uganda's squad in the Eastern sub region group for the 2018–19 ICC World Twenty20 Africa Qualifier tournament.

In September 2018, he was named as the captain of Uganda's squad for the 2018 Africa T20 Cup. The following month, he was named as the captain of Uganda's squad for the 2018 ICC World Cricket League Division Three tournament in Oman.

In May 2019, he was named as the captain of Uganda's squad for the Regional Finals of the 2018–19 ICC T20 World Cup Africa Qualifier tournament in Uganda. He made his Twenty20 International (T20I) debut for Uganda against Botswana on 20 May 2019. In July 2019, he was one of twenty-five players named in the Ugandan training squad, ahead of the Cricket World Cup Challenge League fixtures in Hong Kong. In November 2019, he was named in Uganda's squad for the Cricket World Cup Challenge League B tournament in Oman.

References

1989 births
Living people
Ugandan cricketers
Uganda Twenty20 International cricketers
Wicket-keepers
20th-century Ugandan people
21st-century Ugandan people